Margaret Mercer Elphinstone, comtesse de Flahaut, Baroness Keith and Nairne (12 June 1788 – 11 November 1867), was a Scottish society hostess.

Biography
Margaret, was born in Mayfair on 12 June 1788, the only child of George Elphinstone, 1st Viscount Keith, admiral, and his first wife, Jane, only child and heiress of William Mercer of Aldie, Perth. Upon her mother's death in 1789 she became heiress to the barony of Nairne (then in attainder) and later succeeded to the title.

Margaret was introduced at a young age to the circle of the Princess Charlotte of Wales, to whom she became attached and a close confidante; and this position raised a rumour against her (which, however, she was able entirely to refute) that she betrayed the princess's secrets to the Prince Regent.

On 20 June 1817, at Edinburgh, Margaret married Charles Joseph, comte de Flahaut, aide-de-camp to Napoleon Bonaparte, who had been educated in Britain, where he took refuge during the Bourbon Restoration. The countess held a prominent place in society since her husband held office under Louis-Philippe and later under Napoleon III, and was ambassador at Vienna, and (1860) to the Court of St. James's (London), and finally resided at Paris as Grand Chancellor of the Légion d'honneur. The countess, who was one of the lady patronesses of Almack's and who was a prominent member of polite society, took part in all his social and political work. She was a prolific and perspicacious letter writer, and much of her correspondence is held in the Archives nationales, Paris.

The comtesse died at the Palais de la Légion d'honneur in Paris, on 11 November 1867. Her eldest daughter Emily, Dowager Marchioness of Lansdowne, succeeded as Lady Nairne and to her other English, Scots, and Irish titles.

Further reading
 Chaumont, Jean-Philippe (editor), Archives du général Charles de Flahaut et de sa famille : 565 AP : inventaire, Centre historique des archives nationales, Paris (2005)   
 Scarisbrick, Diana, Margaret de Flahaut (1788–1867): A Scotswoman at the French Court, John Adamson, Cambridge (2019)

Notes

References
 
  
Allardyce's Memoirs of G. K. Elphinstone, 58, 418–19;
Gent. Mag. lxxxvii. ii. 81;
 The Times, 15 Nov. 1867, p. 7, col. 2;
Russell's Moore, iii. 98, 99, 104, 111, 112, &c., vii. 186, &c.;
see also Miss Ellis Cornelia Knight's Autobiography.

External links
 Burke's Peerage
 www.lyon-court.com

Keith, Margaret de Flahault, 2nd Baroness
1788 births
1867 deaths
Scottish political hostesses
Scottish socialites
Anglo-Scots
19th-century Scottish people
Scottish expatriates in France
Keith, Margaret de Flahault, 2nd Baroness
Keith, Margaret de Flahault, 2nd Baroness
Daughters of viscounts
Nairne, Margaret Mercer Elphinstone, 7th Lady